The Declaration of Internet Freedom is a 2012 online declaration in defence of online freedoms signed by a number of prominent organisations and individuals. Notable signatories include Amnesty International, the Electronic Frontier Foundation, Reporters Without Borders, and the Mozilla Foundation, among others.

The declaration supports the establishment of five basic principles for Internet policy:

 Non-censorship of the Internet
 Universal access to fast and affordable networks
 Freedom to connect, communicate, create and innovate over the Internet.
 Protection for new technologies and innovators whose innovations are abused by users.
 Privacy rights and the ability for Internet user to control information about them is used.

The declaration started to be translated through a collaborative effort started by Global Voices in August 2012 and at the end of the first week of August, it had been made available into 70 languages, almost half of which were provided by Project Lingua volunteer translators.

References

External links
 

Petitions
Internet culture
2012 documents
Internet censorship